Pierre Van Wyke is a South African former professional rugby league footballer who represented South Africa in the 1995 and 2000 World Cups.

Playing career
Van Wyke was attached to the Western Reds in Australia, although he never played a first grade match for the club. In 1995 he played for the South African Rhinos when they hosted a touring BARLA side. He was subsequently named in the squad for that year's World Cup and played in all three matches, starting at fullback.

In 1996 he spent the season at the Dewsbury Rams, along with several other South African World Cup players. Despite the hype surrounding their arrival, the imports failed to make a lasting impression at the club and returned home the following year.

He again played for South Africa in the 2000 World Cup, starting two matches at five eighth.

References

Living people
South African rugby league players
South Africa national rugby league team players
Rugby league fullbacks
Rugby league five-eighths
Dewsbury Rams players
South African expatriate rugby league players
Expatriate rugby league players in England
South African expatriate sportspeople in England
Year of birth missing (living people)